Peter Michael Black (born January 18, 1961) is a former American football punter who played five seasons with the Detroit Lions of the National Football League. He was drafted by the Detroit Lions in the seventh round of the 1983 NFL Draft. He played college football at Arizona State University and attended Glendale High School in Glendale, California. He was named first-team All-Pac-10 punter in 1980, 1981 and 1982, averaging 43.4, 42.5 and 44.3 yards per punt respectively in those seasons.

References

External links
Just Sports Stats

Living people
1961 births
Players of American football from California
American football punters
Arizona State Sun Devils football players
Detroit Lions players
Sportspeople from Glendale, California
National Football League replacement players